Whiskey Pete's is a hotel and casino in Primm, Nevada, United States. The hotel has 777 rooms and suites, a swimming pool, gift shop and four restaurants. Whiskey Pete's is one of the Primm Valley Resorts, owned and operated by Affinity Gaming.

History

The area originally was owned by a gas station owner named Pete MacIntyre. Pete is believed to have had a difficult time making ends meet selling gas and had resorted to bootlegging. Primm history remembers him as "Whiskey Pete."

When Whiskey Pete died in 1933, legend has it that he wanted to be buried standing up with a bottle of bootleg in his hands so he could watch over the area. Whiskey Pete's unmarked grave was accidentally exhumed while workers were building a connecting bridge from Whiskey Pete's to Buffalo Bill's (on the other side of I-15). The body was moved and is now said to be buried in one of the caves where Pete cooked up his moonshine.

Whiskey Pete's was opened in 1977 by Ernest Jay Primm as the first of the casinos to be located at what was then called State Line.

In 1983, a new hotel tower was constructed as part of an expansion of the property.

In late 1998, Whiskey Pete's offered the roof of the parking garage as a Valley Hospital Flight For Life Base.

Bonnie and Clyde's death car
The automobile in which Bonnie and Clyde were killed is on display in the lobby of Whiskey Pete's. In the 1990s, the vehicle was exhibited for several years at Primm Valley Resort and Terrible's Gold Ranch Casino in Verdi before being returned to Whiskey Pete's in July 2011.

Alexander Harris Case
Alexander Harris, a seven-year-old child from Mountain View, California was reported missing from the video arcade of Whiskey Pete's in November 1987. A body was discovered one month later off the property. Howard Lee Haupt, of San Diego, was later arrested on suspicion, but was acquitted of all charges in 1989.

Transportation
Free shuttle buses operate between Whiskey Pete's and the resorts other hotels, Primm Valley Resort and Buffalo Bill's.

Whiskey Pete's is connected to Primm Valley Resort by a free single-car monorail across Interstate 15. The tram was constructed by Schwager-Davis using the UniTrak technology and was retrofitted in 1996. The tram travels at 15 mph and can transport 1,200 people, per hour, per direction (pphpd). Doors on either side allow passengers to enter and exit the tram at the same time, thus reducing the dwell time from 2 minutes to 1 minute. Trams arrive every 3 to 5 minutes . However the tram has not run as early as 2016 for an unknown reason.

See also
 Roach, Nevada

References

External links
 

Affinity Gaming
Casinos in Primm, Nevada
Hotels in Primm, Nevada
Resorts in Nevada
UniTrak people movers
Casino hotels